Gabriela Castro (born 11 July 1966) is an Argentine former professional tennis player.

Biography
Castro was a top 100 doubles player and had her most successful period on the WTA Tour when she became the doubles partner of Conchita Martínez in 1989. The pair were runners-up at the Estoril Open and won two ITF $25,000 titles that year. At the 1990 French Open, Castro and Martínez made the round of 16, beating third seeds and former Wimbledon champions Kathy Jordan and Liz Smylie en route. When Castro retired from the tour in 1990 she became Martínez's coach.

Since 2012, Castro has been a director and coach at CEI Tennis in Buenos Aires. She operates the centre with Spanish former professional player Ana Almansa, who runs the Barcelona venue.

WTA Tour finals

Doubles (0–1)

ITF finals

Singles (0–2)

Doubles (3–4)

References

External links
 
 

1966 births
Living people
Argentine female tennis players